Sierra Puebla Nahuatl is one of the Eastern Peripheral varieties of Nahuatl, spoken by ethnic Nahua people in northwestern Puebla state in Mexico.

References

External links 
 

Nahuatl

Languages of Mexico
Uto-Aztecan languages